Dorothy A. Brown (born 1960) is a law professor known for her work on the racial implications of federal tax policy. Brown is Asa Griggs Candler professor of law at Emory University and the author of The Whiteness of Wealth: How the Tax System Impoverishes Black Americans--and How We Can Fix It (2021).

Early life and education
Brown grew up in The Bronx in New York City. Her father James was a plumber who was unable to join the local union because of his race. Brown graduated high school at age 16. She received a Bachelor of Science from Fordham University in 1980, a JD from Georgetown University Law Center in 1983 and an LLM in Tax from New York University School of Law in 1984.

Career
Brown was initially interested in the U.S. tax code and worked as a tax attorney, an investment banker, and was appointed to the Department of Housing and Urban Development by President George H.W. Bush's administration in 1989. Initially a Republican, she switched parties and supported Barack Obama's election in 2008.

Brown has been a professor of law at Emory University School of Law since 2008. Prior to coming to Emory she worked at Washington and Lee University School of Law where she was the director of the Frances Lewis Law Center. Before that, she taught at both George Mason University and the University of Cincinnati.

Brown's book, The Whiteness of Wealth: How the Tax System Impoverishes Black Americans--and How We Can Fix It, views tax policies through a critical race theory lens and examines the Black-white wealth gap with an eye towards tax reforms that could help lessen this gap. Brown has also written two legal textbooks: Federal Income Taxation: Cases, Problems; and Materials, and Critical Race Theory: Cases, Materials and Problems, both published by Thomson West. Brown writes about the historical and present-day implications of U.S. tax policy for mainstream media outlets such as Bloomberg News, NPR, and CNN.

Brown was featured on the cover of Bloomberg Businessweek in March 2021 with the tagline "Is the Tax Code Racist?" The feature article about her outlines some of her research on the ways the existing tax code preferences white Americans. It outlines her reform plan which would remove exemptions and deductions that increase this inequality. Brown believes that all income should be taxable, including proceeds from investments, gifts, inheritances, or property sales She also supports an annual tax credit for people whose wealth is below the U.S. median which would help Americans with fewer resources to build up their personal wealth.

References

External links
 Personal website

1960 births
Taxation in the United States
Living people
Lawyers from New York City
People from the Bronx
Fordham University alumni
Georgetown University Law Center alumni
Emory University School of Law faculty